Flensburg station is the main station of the city of Flensburg in the German state of Schleswig-Holstein. Lines run from it to Kiel, to Hamburg via Schleswig and Neumünster and to Fredericia in Denmark. Between December 2007 and December 2015, Flensburg was connected to Deutsche Bahn's Intercity-Express network. The station also handles cross-border rail traffic between Germany and Denmark.

History 

On 1 April 1854 the Flensburg–Tönning line was opened by the British entrepreneur, Sir Samuel Morton Peto to a station outside the city at Holzkrug. On 4 October, its station in the city was opened, which became known as the English Station (Englischer Bahnhof). This station was at the south end of Flensburg Fjord in the Flensburg old town and was formally handed over for operations on 25 October by the Danish king, Frederik VII.

Ten years later, in 1864, the line was extended to Vojens in North Schleswig (now in Denmark) and soon after to Fredericia. In 1869, the current, shorter route to Hamburg via Schleswig and Rendsburg was put into operation.

In 1883 the original, simple station building was replaced by a more complex design of Johannes Otzen, a famous church architect. The original station was subsequently converted into Germany's first bus station. On 1 February 1927, the present station was inaugurated outside Flensburg’s old town, on the North Schleswig Loop, which avoids the old Flensburg terminal station. Trains to and from Denmark run over a loop, which is several kilometres long, to reach the station. The station in the town built in 1883 became a freight yard and was later closed.

Passenger services were closed on the line to Husum via Löwenstedt in 1959. In 1981, the last service ran on the line to Niebüll.

Operations

Station facilities 
The Flensburg station is a particularly impressive collection of brick expressionism of the 1920s and some of its outbuildings are partially protected as monuments.

Routes
 Neumünster–Flensburg railway
 Kiel–Flensburg railway
 Flensburg–Fredericia railway
 Flensburg–Niebüll railway (until 1981)
 Flensburg–Husum railway (until 1959)
 Flensburg Port Railway (only freight)

Tracks 
The station has several tracks, but only four of them have access to a platform. The tracks were electrified in 1996  and the track were renumbered, with track 5 near the reception building and track 1, furthest away from the main station building, unusually in Germany.

In normal usage platforms are used as follows:
platform track 5: regional trains to and from Neumünster
 platform track 4: regional trains to and from Kiel
 platform track 2: long distance and regional trains to and from Neumünster/Hamburg as well as to Denmark
 platform track 1: long distance and regional trains to and from Neumünster/Hamburg as well as to Denmark

Rail services 

In long-distance transport, a Eurocity service runs from Aalborg to Hamburg via Flensburg. These operate as Intercity services in Germany. In addition, an Intercity train pair provides direct connections on the weekend from Flensburg to Munich and Cologne.

DB Regionalbahn Schleswig Holstein operates Regional-Express and Regionalbahn services between Neumünster and Flensburg every hour or two hours.

The Flensburg–Kiel route is currently also operated by DB Regionalbahn Schleswig Holstein every hour (as of 2016).

Notes

References

External links 

Railway stations in Schleswig-Holstein
Station
Railway stations in Germany opened in 1927